Clare Elizabeth Polkinghorne (born 1 February 1989) is an Australian professional soccer player who plays as a defender for Swedish Damallsvenskan club Vittsjö GIK and the Australia women's national team.

Career
For the 2014 season, Polkinghorne was loaned to INAC Kobe Leonessa in Japan. She signed for Portland Thorns of the National Women's Soccer League after the 2015 FIFA Women's World Cup.

Portland Thorns waived Polkinghorne in February 2016.

On 7 January 2017, Polkinghorne become the first player to play 100 club games in the W-League, all of which have been played for Brisbane Roar.

Polkinghorne first represented the Australia women's national soccer team in 2006 and has played more than 100 matches, scoring 9 goals. She played in both the 2007 FIFA Women's World Cup and 2011 FIFA Women's World Cup and was an unused squad member during the 2015 FIFA Women's World Cup.

On 7 June 2018, Polkinghorne signed with the Houston Dash.

In December 2020, Polkinghorne re-signed with Brisbane Roar after spending the off-season at Avaldsnes.

Polkinghorne was selected for the Australian women's football Matildas soccer team which qualified for the Tokyo 2020 Olympics. The Matildas advanced to the quarter-finals with one victory and a draw in the group play. In the quarter-finals they beat Great Britain 4-3 after extra time. However, they lost 1–0 to Sweden in the semi-final and were then beaten 4–3 in the bronze medal playoff by USA. Full details.

Career statistics

International goals

Honours

Individual

 2012–13 Julie Dolan Medal: Best player in the 2012–13 W-League
 2017–18 Julie Dolan Medal: Best player in the 2017–18 W-League (jointly with Sam Kerr)

Club
 Queensland Sting
 Women's National Soccer League: 2005

 Brisbane Roar
 W-League Premiership: 2008–09, 2012–13
 W-League Championship: 2008–09, 2010–11

Country
 Australia
 AFF Women's Championship: 2008
 AFC Women's Asian Cup: 2010
 AFC Olympic Qualifying Tournament: 2016
 Tournament of Nations: 2017
 FFA Cup of Nations: 2019

See also
 List of women's footballers with 100 or more caps

References

External links
 

1989 births
Living people
Australian women's soccer players
Brisbane Roar FC (A-League Women) players
Vittsjö GIK players
Australia women's international soccer players
2007 FIFA Women's World Cup players
2011 FIFA Women's World Cup players
2015 FIFA Women's World Cup players
Footballers at the 2016 Summer Olympics
Soccer players from Brisbane
Nadeshiko League players
INAC Kobe Leonessa players
Australian expatriate women's soccer players
Expatriate women's footballers in Japan
Australian expatriate sportspeople in Japan
Women's association football defenders
Portland Thorns FC players
A-League Women players
National Women's Soccer League players
Australian expatriate sportspeople in the United States
Expatriate women's soccer players in the United States
Olympic soccer players of Australia
FIFA Century Club
2019 FIFA Women's World Cup players
Houston Dash players
Footballers at the 2020 Summer Olympics
Australian expatriate sportspeople in Norway
Australian expatriate sportspeople in Sweden
Expatriate women's footballers in Norway
Expatriate women's footballers in Sweden
Avaldsnes IL managers
Damallsvenskan players
Toppserien players